The 1933 Oregon State Beavers football team represented Oregon State University in the Pacific Coast Conference (PCC) during the 1933 college football season.  In their first season under head coach Lon Stiner, the Beavers compiled a 6–2–2 record (2–1–1 against PCC opponents), finished in fourth place in the PCC, and outscored their opponents, 88 to 48.  The team played its home games at Bell Field in Corvallis, Oregon.

In January 1933, Paul J. Schissler resigned as Oregon State's head football coach. In May 1933, 30-year-old Lon Stiner was appointed as the school's new head football coach. Stiner had been working as an assistant football coach at Oregon State since 1928. Stiner remained the head football coach at Oregon State through the 1948 season, compiling a record of 74–49–17.

Schedule

See also
Pyramid Play

References

Oregon State
Oregon State Beavers football seasons
Oregon State Beavers football